Escaut was a department of the French First Republic and French First Empire in present-day Belgium and Netherlands. It was named after the river Scheldt (Escô, Schelde), which is called the Escaut in French. It was created on 1 October 1795, when the Austrian Netherlands and the Prince-Bishopric of Liège were officially annexed by the French Republic. Before annexation by France, its territory was part of the County of Flanders and the Dutch Republic (Staats-Vlaanderen).

The Chef-lieu of the department was Ghent (Gand in French). The department was subdivided into the following four arrondissements and cantons (as of 1812):

 Gand: Cruyshouthem, Deysne, Evergem, Gand (4 cantons), Loochristi, Nazareth, Nevèle, Oosterzeele, Sommergem and Waerschoot.
 Termonde: Alost (2 cantons), Beveren, Hamme, Lockeren, Saint-Gillis, Saint-Nicolas, Tamise, Termonde, Wetteren and Zèle.
 Eccloo: Assenède, Axel, Capryck, Eccloo, L'Écluse, Hulst, Oostbourg and Yzendick.
 Andernarde: Andernarde (2 cantons), Grammont, Herzèle, Maria-Hoorebecke, Niderbrakel, Ninove, Renaix and Sotteghem.

After Napoleon was defeated in 1814, the department became part of the United Kingdom of the Netherlands. Its territory corresponded with the present Belgian province of East Flanders and the Dutch region of Zeelandic Flanders.

Administration

Prefects
The Prefect was the highest state representative in the department.

General Secretaries
The General Secretary was the deputy to the Prefect.

Subprefects of Andenarde

Subprefects of Eccloo
This subprefecture was created in 1803, replacing Sas-de-Gand.

Subprefects of Gand
Until 1811, the Prefect also held the office of Subprefect of Gand.

Subprefects of Sas-de-Gand
This subprefecture was replaced by Eccloo in 1803.

Subprefects of Termonde

References

Former departments of France in Belgium
Former departments of France in the Netherlands
1795 establishments in France
History of East Flanders
History of Zeeland
Zeelandic Flanders